Numerical may refer to:

 Number
 Numerical digit
 Numerical analysis